Bocagea  is a genus of plants in the family Annonaceae. It comprises four species distributed in Brazil.  Augustin Saint-Hilaire the French botanist who first formally described the genus named it after Josephi Mariae de Souza du Bocage, who he said beautifully translated a poem about flowers into Portuguese and illustrated it.

All species of Bocagea are rare and are at least endangered.

Description
Bocagea are shrubs or small trees with two rows of petals, 3 interior and 3 exterior, and 6 stamens.

Species
There are currently four described species in Bocagea:
 Bocagea asymmetrica Mello-Silva & J.C.Lopes
Bocagea longipedunculata Mart.
Bocagea moeniana Mello-Silva & J.C.Lopes
Bocagea viridis A.St.-Hil.

References

Annonaceae
Annonaceae genera
Flora of Brazil
Taxa named by Augustin Saint-Hilaire